Vladan Lukić (born 16 February 1970) is a Serbian former professional footballer who played as a striker. At international level, he made appearances for Yugoslavia and FR Yugoslavia.

Playing career
After arrival to Red Star Belgrade from hometown Sopot, Lukić entered first team and immediately showed scoring abilities. He also had a good start with Yugoslavia national team, but his luck turned around in 1991 in a match against Austria, when he broke his leg in a collision with teammate Siniša Mihajlović. Lukić returned to football eventually, but never reached his full potential as a player. He had top performances in the 1996–97 season, when he won the Swiss Football League with FC Sion. The following year, he finished second placed in French Ligue 1 with FC Metz. He left the French club in protest against the NATO bombing of Yugoslavia.

Administrative career
After retiring from playing Lukić returned to his hometown and became the chairman of FK Sopot who were competing in the Serbian League Belgrade, which is the third tier of the Serbian football pyramid.

Red Star Belgrade president
On 26 May 2009, Lukić became president of Red Star Belgrade, replacing previous club president Dan Tana, whilst the club were experiencing major financial difficulties with their account blocked due to reported debt of €23 million. Along with Lukić, another former Red Star player came back to the club in administrative role—Ivan Adžić became the club's new sporting director. From the very beginning Lukić's tenure at the club was accompanied with rumours that Red Star's éminence grise Goran Vesić (also Democratic Party's prominent member and longtime political operative) is the real decision maker within the club.

Lukić's first official order of business was hiring new head coach Vladimir "Pižon" Petrović in early June 2009.

In November 2009, public prosecutor's office demanded for Lukić to be prohibited from performing the function of the president of Red Star Belgrade and fined due to his alleged support to hooligans. In December 2009, at the Serbian SuperLiga winter break, Red Star led the standings with three points ahead of eternal rivals FK Partizan. At the same time, Lukić announced that over his seven months in charge, the club managed to lower its debt by €6 million. Soon after the league restart, Lukić fired head coach Petrović despite Red Star still leading the league by three points, replacing him with club's youth system coach Ratko Dostanić. The coaching change did not produce the desired effect as the club not only failed to add to its lead at the top of the table, but instead lost its points advantage over Partizan. The league title was decided on 8 May at the Eternal Derby with Partizan winning the controversial match 1–0 at JNA Stadium on a long-range goal by Raća Petrović.

During the summer 2010 off-season, Lukić struck a sponsorship deal with Russian oil company Gazprom Neft. The terms of the five-year deal between two parties were not disclosed.

By late November 2011, information appeared in Sportski žurnal sports daily that Red Star's debt again swelled up to €42.6 million, which the club's general secretary Đorđe Stefanović vehemently denied, saying that the club's operational debt is between €25–33 million.

On 13 November 2012, Lukić resigned his post as club president. He was temporarily replaced by the so-called "working group" (also known as 'stabilization commission')—formed on the initiative by deputy prime minister Aleksandar Vučić and headed by Nebojša Čović—whose goal was to determine and assess the club's financial situation as well as to organize the elections for club's new president. In mid-December 2012, Dragan Džajić was elected club president (he was the only candidate after Branko Tekić's bid got rejected) while Čović's working group announced its findings of the club's financial analysis from 1996 until 2012 – pertaining to Lukić's tenure as club president, when he took over in late May 2009 the club debt was reported to be €22,398,806 and reportedly grew to €44,109,565 by November 2012 when Lukić left.

Honours

Player
FC Sion
Swiss Championship: 1996–97
Swiss Cup: 1996–97

References

External links
 Profile on Serbian federation site
 

1970 births
Living people
Serbian footballers
Yugoslav footballers
Yugoslavia international footballers
Serbia and Montenegro international footballers
Yugoslav First League players
Red Star Belgrade footballers
La Liga players
Atlético Madrid footballers
Segunda División players
CA Marbella footballers
FK Vojvodina players
OFK Beograd players
FC Sion players
Ligue 1 players
FC Metz players
Members of the Assembly of KK Crvena zvezda
Super League Greece players
Paniliakos F.C. players
Association football forwards
Expatriate footballers in Spain
Expatriate footballers in France
Expatriate footballers in Switzerland
Expatriate footballers in Greece
Serbian expatriate footballers
Serbia and Montenegro expatriate footballers
Serbia and Montenegro footballers
Serbia and Montenegro expatriate sportspeople in Spain
Serbia and Montenegro expatriate sportspeople in France
Serbia and Montenegro expatriate sportspeople in Switzerland
Serbia and Montenegro expatriate sportspeople in Greece